{{Speciesbox
| image = Rio_Grande_River_Cooter_Fort_Worth_Zoo_061721.jpg
| image_caption = Rio Grande Cooter at the Fort Worth Zoo in Texas
| image2 = PB110463CR.jpg
| image2_caption = A baby Rio Grande Cooter from Kinney County, Texas
| status = NT
| status_system = IUCN3.1
| status_ref = <ref name=iucn>van Dijk PP (2011). "Pseudemys gorzugi (errata version published in 2016)". The IUCN Red List of Threatened Species 2011: e.T18459A97425928. https://dx.doi.org/10.2305/IUCN.UK.2011-1.RLTS.T18459A8297596.en. Retrieved 13 February 2021.</ref>
| genus = Pseudemys
| species = gorzugi
| authority = Ward, 1984
| synonyms =
 Pseudemys concinna gorzugi 
 Pseudemys gorzugi 
| synonyms_ref = 
}}

The Rio Grande cooter (Pseudemys gorzugi) is a species of turtle in the family Emydidae. The species is native to northeastern Mexico and the adjacent southwestern United States.

Geographic range
The Rio Grande cooter is found in the Rio Grande drainage of Mexico (Chihuahua, Coahuila, Nuevo León, Tamaulipas), New Mexico, and Texas.

Habitat

Etymology
The specific name, gorzugi, is in honor of George R. Zug, Curator of Amphibians and Reptiles, National Museum of Natural History.Beolens B, Watkins M, Grayson M (2011). The Eponym Dictionary of Reptiles. Baltimore: Johns Hopkins University Press. xiii + 296 pp. . (Pseudemys gorzugi, pp. 104, 294).

References

External links

Further reading
Ernst CH (1990). "Pseudemys gorzugi Ward, Rio Grande Cooter". Catalogue of American Amphibians and Reptiles (461): 1–2. (Pseudemys gorzugi, new status).
Ernst CH, Lovich JE (2009). Turtles of the United States and Canada, Second Edition. Baltimore: Johns Hopkins University Press. xii + 827 pp. . (Pseudemys gorzugi, pp. 377–380).
Powell R, Conant R, Collins JT (2016). Peterson Field Guide to Reptiles and Amphibians of Eastern and Central North America, Fourth Edition. Boston and New York: Houghton Mifflin Harcourt. xiv + 494 pp., 47 plates, 207 figures. . (Pseudemys gorzugi, pp. 214–215, Figure 95).
Ward JP (1984). "Relationships of the chrysemyd turtles of North America (Testudines: Emydidae)". Special Publications of the Museum of Texas Technological University 21: 1-50. (Pseudemys concinna gorzugi'', new subspecies, p. 29, figure 6).

Pseudemys
Fauna of the Rio Grande valleys
Reptiles of Mexico
Reptiles of the United States
Reptiles described in 1984
Taxonomy articles created by Polbot